Salmea is a genus of plants in the tribe Heliantheae within the family Asteraceae.

 Species
 Salmea caleoides Griseb. - Cuba
 Salmea eupatoria DC. - Bolivia
 Salmea glaberrima C.Wright ex Griseb. - Cuba
 Salmea insipida (Jacq.) Bolick & R.K.Jansen - Cuba
 Salmea oligocephala Hemsl. - Oaxaca, Chiapas, México State, Michoacán
 Salmea orthocephala Standl. & Steyerm. - Guatemala, Honduras, Chiapas
 Salmea palmeri S.Watson - Guerrero, Jalisco, Michoacán
 Salmea petrobioides Griseb. - Bahamas
 Salmea scandens (L.) DC. - widespread in Mesoamerica, West Indies, + South America
 Salmea umbratilis B.L.Rob. - Cuba
 formerly included
several species now placed in other genera:  Oblivia Otopappus Trichospira

References

Heliantheae
Asteraceae genera